MS-CHAP is the Microsoft version of the Challenge-Handshake Authentication Protocol, CHAP. The protocol exists in two versions, MS-CHAPv1 (defined in RFC 2433) and MS-CHAPv2 (defined in RFC 2759). MS-CHAPv2 was introduced with pptp3-fix  that was included in Windows NT 4.0 SP4 and was added to Windows 98 in the "Windows 98 Dial-Up Networking Security Upgrade Release" and Windows 95 in the "Dial Up Networking 1.3 Performance & Security Update for MS Windows 95" upgrade. Windows Vista dropped support for MS-CHAPv1.

MS-CHAP is used as one authentication option in Microsoft's implementation of the PPTP protocol for virtual private networks. It is also used as an authentication option with RADIUS servers which are used with IEEE 802.1X (e.g., WiFi security using the WPA-Enterprise protocol). It is further used as the main authentication option of the Protected Extensible Authentication Protocol (PEAP).

Compared with CHAP, MS-CHAP:
 is enabled by negotiating CHAP Algorithm 0x80 (0x81 for MS-CHAPv2) in LCP option 3, Authentication Protocol
 provides an authenticator-controlled password change mechanism
 provides an authenticator-controlled authentication retry mechanism
 defines failure codes returned in the Failure packet message field

MS-CHAPv2 provides mutual authentication between peers by piggybacking a peer challenge on the Response packet and an authenticator response on the Success packet.

MS-CHAP requires each peer to either know the plaintext password, or an MD4 hash of the password. and does not transmit the password over the link.  As such, it is not compatible with most password storage formats.

Cryptanalysis 

Several weaknesses have been identified in MS-CHAP and MS-CHAPv2. The DES encryption used in NTLMv1 and MS-CHAPv2 to encrypt the NTLM password hash make custom hardware attacks utilizing the method of brute force feasible. 

More recently, MS-CHAP has been completely broken.

See also
 EFF DES cracker

References 

Broken cryptography algorithms
Internet protocols
Microsoft Windows security technology
Computer access control protocols